Decora is an unincorporated community in Gordon County, in the U.S. state of Georgia.

History
A post office called Decora was established in 1888, and remained in operation until being discontinued in 1905. Decora is a name derived from Latin, meaning "good behavior".

References

Unincorporated communities in Gordon County, Georgia
Unincorporated communities in Georgia (U.S. state)